This is a list of Cambodian films from 2004.

References

2004
Films
Cambodian